The Basilian monastery and Greek Catholic church of St. Onuphrius in Lviv, Ukraine is located north of the Old Town, at the base of the Castle Hill.

Records mention a wooden church existed at this site already in the 13th century during the reign of Leo I of Halych. During the second half of the 15th century a monastery was built next to the church. A stone church was built in 1550 and in 1585 a monastery surrounded with fortifications. The church was destroyed and rebuilt several times. Damaged by Turks in 1672, it underwent a major reconstruction in 1680. In 1776 the church was connected with the previously separate chapel of the Holy Trinity, adjoining it to the north, a new classicist bell tower was built in 1820 and in the years 1821-1824 the presbytery was extended and a sacristy added. The church's present day look dates to 1902 when the southern nave was constructed symmetrically and both were topped with hexagonal domes. Inside the church holds 18th century polychromies and an iconostasis from 1908.

Under Soviet rule the church was closed and changed into a museum of the first Russian printer Ivan Fedorovych, who worked in the monastery at the end of the 16th century and is buried there. After the collapse of the Soviet Union it was returned to the Basilians and restored.

External links
 Monastery and church of St. Onuphrius in the Encyclopedia of Ukraine

Monasteries in Lviv
Churches in Lviv
Eastern Catholic monasteries in Ukraine
Monasteries of the Order of Saint Basil the Great